Abbeville is a small country house in the townland of Abbeville in County Tipperary.  It is set in relict parkland.  

It is a three-bay, three-storey house with one-storey flanking wing walls to either side, built c. 1840, and with an earlier, possibly 17th century, three-bay, three-storey rear wing. The fenestration of the main front is composed of elaborate tripartite windows with carved pilasters, except for the central bay, where there are double round-headed windows over the doorcase. The front door is flanked by engaged clustered columns and has an elaborate cobweb fanlight above. The datestone "1773" does not seem to relate to any part of the present building, but may indicate a previous phase of building activity. There are substantial ranges of limestone outbuildings to the south-east including one range with segmental and depressed-arch carriage arches.   

Abbeville was the seat of the Hemsworth family from the early 18th century until c1890, when Thomas Gerard Hemsworth sold up and emigrated to Canada.  Some land was sold to the Dawson family through the Encumbered Estates Court c1850, but the Hemsworths still had  in c.1870. The Killeens bought the entire estate from the Hemsworths in about c.1900, and ever since, the house is still currently owned by the Killeen family. The park retains the remains of a canal to the north. 

This is a fine example of a typical country house in Ireland and it is currently being re-established and extended to its former glory. The property is listed on North Tipperary County Council's record of protected structures and on the National Inventory of Architectural Heritage.

References

Houses in the Republic of Ireland
Buildings and structures in County Tipperary